The 2004 K2 League Championship was the first competition of the Korea National League Championship. R League club Korean Police was invited to the competition.

Group stage

Group A

Group B

Group C

Group D

Knockout stage

Bracket

Semi-finals

Final

See also
2004 in South Korean football
2004 K2 League

References

External links
RSSSF

Korea National League Championship seasons
National Championship